Tomas Villadolid Apacible is a former congressman representing the First Legislative District of the province of Batangas in the Philippine House of Representatives. He defeated former Congressman and Executive Secretary Eduardo Ermita in the 2010 elections. He is also a former Commissioner of the Bureau of Customs, Senior Undersecretary of the Department of Finance, Senior Governor Development Bank of The Philippines and Private Sector Representative to the Land Bank of The Philippines Board of Directors.

He sat as Senior Vice Chairman of the Committee of Trade and Industry, and Southern Tagalog Regional Development. He was also a member of the following committees: Ways and Means, Agriculture and Food, Energy, Tourism, Public Works and Highways, Information, Communication and Technology, Public Order and Safety, and Banks and Financial Intermediaries.  

Apacible is married to Maria Dolores Cacdac with whom he has three children: Alyanna, Tomas II, and Airene.

References 

People from Batangas
Living people
1946 births
Liberal Party (Philippines) politicians
Members of the House of Representatives of the Philippines from Batangas
Commissioners of the Bureau of Customs of the Philippines
San Beda University alumni